Australian Princess is an Australian reality television show that first premiered on Network Ten on 5 October 2005. It is produced by Granada Australia, who are responsible for other programs such as Dancing with the Stars, Australia's Next Top Model, and Merrick and Rosso Unplanned. It is an Australian version of American Princess.

The show is also aired in the United Kingdom on ITV2, in Finland on SubTV, in Canada on W Network, in the United States on WE: Women's Entertainment, in the Middle East on MBC 4, and in Belgium on Vitaya.

The contestants have been judged by Paul Burrell, Jane Luedecke (sister of Sarah, Duchess of York) and Jean Broke-Smith since its inception along with various other guest judges. The two series of the show were hosted by Jackie O.

Overview
Fuelled by the fairy tale story of Mary Donaldson who, in 2004, married Denmark’s heir to the throne, Crown Prince Frederick, Australian Princess scoured the country to find 12 young Australian women and give them the journey of their lives.

Paul Burrell, former butler to Diana, Princess of Wales and footman in the Royal Household of Queen Elizabeth II, led a team of international experts, who attempted to shape these ordinary 'Aussie' girls into worldly sophisticated women ready to handle the challenges of being a young royal. The contestants took classes, met challenges and attempted to convince the judges that they have what it takes to mix in elite social circles both in Australia and the United Kingdom.

Cast

Host
 Jackie O

Judges
 Paul Burrell
 Jane Luedecke
 Jean Broke-Smith

Series one
The first season of Australian Princess was aired in late 2005 on Network Ten. Despite initial critical cynicism of the program's concept, it quickly gained cult status and was praised for the quality of its production, witty and often cringe-induced humour (one recalls a contestant's sobbing lament of the deaths of two icons she held dear - Diana, Princess of Wales, and Tupac Shakur).

Ally Mansell from the University of Wollongong and Danebank was announced the winner during the final show, which was aired in Australia on 23 November 2005. She was crowned a "princess" in the finale and won a prize package including a hand gilded tiara and the chance to be escorted to a gala ball by a real life Prince Charming in the United Kingdom.

The first series was released on DVD on 12 December 2005.

Contestants
 Zena Alliu, 20, South Australia
 Christine Bryan, 22, Queensland
 Laura Davey, 19, Victoria
 Alana Gray, 20, South Australia
 Carryn Jack, 19, Australian Capital Territory
 Laura Kiddle, 22, Victoria
 Ally Mansell, 20, New South Wales (Winner)
 Veronica McCann, 21, Western Australia
 Kirusha Moodley, 28, Western Australia
 Zena Moussa, 21, New South Wales
 Belinda Royal, 24, Victoria
 Wendy Slack-Smith, 27, New South Wales (Runner Up)
 Melissa Starzynski, 23, Victoria
 Abby Valdes, 28, Victoria (Second Runner Up)

Both winner and runner up Australian Princesses, Ally Mansell and Wendy Slack-Smith, later appeared as contestants on the game show Friday Night Games.

Guest appearances
 Princess Tamara
 Jenny West
 Christian Lindqvist
 Nick Moore
 James Ashton
 David Grant
 Diana Fischer
 James Whitaker
 Richard Aronowitz
 Francis Wright
 Sonia, Lady McMahon

Series two
The second season was broadcast during the summer of 2006/07.

Contestants
 Carly Andrews, 19, Australian Capital Territory
 Kylie Booby, 22, New South Wales (Winner)
 Leanne Churchill, 30, Victoria
 Lianzi Fields, 19, Australian Capital Territory
 Jaya Henderson, 23, Western Australia
 Stephanie Jenkinson, 22, South Australia (Second Runner Up)
 Amanda Lavis, 26, New South Wales
 Amy Manning, 24, New South Wales (Runner Up)
 Bianca Micallef, 22, Victoria
 Carolyn Pearson, 22, Victoria
 Kate Perkins, 25, Victoria
 Elise Udy, 20, New South Wales

After the series Kylie Booby and Stephanie Jenkinson were also seen at the New Year's Eve 2006 celebration in Sydney. Jenkinson is now a radio announcer on Nova 91.9 from 7pm-10 pm week nights.

References

External links
 Australian Princess website

Fashion-themed reality television series
2000s Australian reality television series
Network 10 original programming
2005 Australian television series debuts
2007 Australian television series endings
Television series by ITV Studios